Short Stories is the debut album by Jon and Vangelis, the collaboration between Jon Anderson of the progressive rock band Yes and electronic music pioneer Vangelis. This was not the first time that the two had worked together: Vangelis had auditioned to be Rick Wakeman's replacement in Yes in 1974, but the role was given to Patrick Moraz. In 1975, Jon Anderson sang on "So Long Ago So Clear" from Heaven and Hell.

Background and composition
Putting overdubs aside, the cuts on Short Stories were all improvised one-take tape recordings tracked in 1979, with the album's working title Spont. [Spontaneous] Music based on this process. Vangelis said that the album may have taken a total of only two and a half non-consecutive weeks to produce, and "just four days to start with." Both Anderson and Vangelis wanted to work together just to have a fun time, the former explaining, "I won't say effortless, but the enjoyment of making music without prior conceptions, without deciding what it's going to be. Just do it." Sounds writer John Gill, who interviewed the pair for an article regarding how Short Stories was made, said that the two apparently wanted to make an album that would be out of the styles they had commonly been labeled under by both the press and consumers with past releases. Short Stories garners numerous elements of classical, pop, rock and folk.

Critical reception

Despite its commercial performance, critical response to Short Stories, both upon release and in retrospect, has been mixed. A Smash Hits journalist put the blame entirely on Anderson for making the album "entirely unlistenable"; he jokingly described his lyrics as "the kind of 'cosmic' drivel that gets hippies a bad name", and felt that the "tuneless" melodies were written by just coming up with notes and pitches at random. Billboard Magazine observer noted that Anderson's "clear voice" and his lyrics fit well with the structure of the compositions based on "swirling keyboard work". In a retrospective review, AllMusic reviewer Dave Connolly called the record "underwhelming", saying that it had very few "nearly memorable moments"; he criticized it for being more focused on melody than making the arrangements less "amorphous" and "paper-thin", an issue also present on the last Yes album Anderson sang on before working on Short Stories, Tormato.

Gary Graff, who wrote a mixed review for The Beaver County Times, mainly criticized Vangelis' musical work on the record, feeling it was much more of a Vangelis album than a collaborative LP between him and Anderson and would have been more commercially successful if only he was credited on it. Although he called it one of Vangelis' better releases so far, he also named it Anderson's worst to date. As for the latter's involvement, he praised his "strong" vocal performance, calling it far better than how he sang on Tormato, but opined he focused too much on word play that caused his lyrics to be too complex for average listeners. The more-than-five-minute lengths of each song was also panned in Graff's review, writing that listeners could lose interest in a track after only three minutes. He also wrote that it would garner fans of the works of bands such as Pink Floyd and King Crimson but backfire Anderson and Vangelis' plan of increasing attention from the Yes fan base.

In more favorable reviews, The Sydney Morning Herald's Madeleine d'Haeye called Short Stories "an innovative, pleasing combination of two highly talent musicians exploring new horizons", highlighting Anderson's "beautiful clarity of tone" when singing high pitches and Vangelis "finely matched" accompaniments. In 1982, R. S. Murthi reviewed the album for the New Straits Times as one of the "Aesthetes of electronics", spotlighting Anderson's "spirited energy" and Vangelis' skillful musical arrangements.

Track listing
All music by Vangelis; all lyrics by Jon Anderson

Vinyl and cassette
"Curious Electric" 6:42
"Each and Everyday" 3:43
"Bird Song" 1:26
"I Hear You Now" 5:13
"The Road" 4:31
"Far Away in Baagad" 2:18
"Love Is" 5:46
"One More Time" 6:18
"Thunder" 2:14
"A Play Within a Play" 7:00

CD
The CD insert lists ten tracks as per the vinyl / cassette release, but the CD is actually divided into eight tracks as follows.
"Curious Electric" 6:42
"Each and Everyday / Bird Song" 5:08
"I Hear You Now" 5:13
"The Road" 4:31
"Far Away in Baagad / Love Is" 8:04
"One More Time" 6:18
"Thunder" 2:14
"A Play Within a Play" 7:00

Personnel
Jon Anderson - all vocals
Vangelis - keyboards, synthesizers, piano, electronics
Raphael Preston - acoustic guitars on "The Road"
Technical
Raphael Preston - engineer
Veronique Skawinska - photography

Charts

Weekly

Year-end

Certifications

Production
Produced By Vangelis
Engineer: Raphael Preston
Mastering: Hitoshi Takiguchi

References

1980 debut albums
Jon and Vangelis albums
Polydor Records albums